The 2021 Canoe Marathon European Championships took place from 7 to 11 July 2021 in Moscow, Russia.

Medalists

Senior

Under 23

Junior

Medal table

Participants
A total of 108 canoeists from the national teams of the following 9 countries was registered to compete at 2021 Canoe Marathon European Championships.

 (5)
 (12)
 (39)
 (2)
 (5)
 (12)
 (4)
 (28)
 (1)

References

External links
European Canoe Association
Results

Canoe Marathon European Championships
Canoe Marathon
International sports competitions hosted by Russia
European Championships Canoe Marathon
Canoeing and kayaking competitions in Russia
Sports competitions in Moscow